Alwiyah binti Talib is a Malaysian politician from Bersatu. She is the Member of Johor State Legislative Assembly for Endau since 2018 after winning it in the 2018 Johor state election on the ticket of UMNO. In 2022 Johor state election, she retain Endau seat after winning it in the on the ticket of PPBM.

Politics 
On 12 May 2018, she quitted UMNO and joined BERSATU.

On 30 January 2022, she denied would leave PPBM. She instead said that her loyalty was still to the party and slammed the allegation, describing it as baseless and damaged her reputation as a loyal party member.

Election results

Honours 
  :
  Sultan Ibrahim Medal (PIS)

References 

Living people
1961 births
People from Johor
Malaysian people of Malay descent
Malaysian Muslims
Former United Malays National Organisation politicians
Malaysian United Indigenous Party politicians
Women MLAs in Johor
21st-century Malaysian politicians
Members of the Johor State Legislative Assembly
21st-century Malaysian women politicians